Paulo César da Silva Martins (born 20 November 1991) is a Brazilian footballer. He is currently playing for Khonkaen. Martins is a very experienced footballer having also played for Juazeiro Juazeiro, EC Poções, and Serrano FBC in Brazil, Monte Carlo in Macau, and Payam Mashhad in Iran.

On 19 January 2017, the Asian Football Confederation declared Paulo Martins and eleven other Brazilian footballers ineligible to represent East Timor.

References

External links 
  

1991 births
Living people
Footballers from São Paulo
Brazilian footballers
Association football defenders
C.D. Monte Carlo players
Al-Ittihad Kalba SC players
Paulo Martins
PSM Makassar players
Brazilian expatriate footballers
Brazilian expatriate sportspeople in Macau
Expatriate footballers in Macau
Brazilian expatriate sportspeople in Iran
Expatriate footballers in Iran
Brazilian expatriate sportspeople in the United Arab Emirates
Expatriate footballers in the United Arab Emirates
Brazilian expatriate sportspeople in Thailand
Expatriate footballers in Thailand
Brazilian expatriate sportspeople in Indonesia
Expatriate footballers in Indonesia
UAE Pro League players

Timor-Leste international footballers
East Timorese footballers
Asian Games competitors for East Timor
Footballers at the 2014 Asian Games